The Chouinard Art Institute was a professional art school founded in 1921 by Nelbert Murphy Chouinard (1879–1969) in the Westlake neighborhood of Los Angeles, California. In 1961, Walt and Roy Disney guided the merger of the Chouinard Art Institute and the Los Angeles Conservatory of Music to establish the California Institute of the Arts. Chouinard continued to operate until the new campus opened in 1970.

History
Founded by artist and educator Nelbert Murphy Chouinard in 1921 with the goal of creating a renowned art school on the West Coast, the school grew during the subsequent decades and in 1935 it was recognized by the California state government as a non-profit educational facility. In 1929, Walt Disney began driving his inexperienced animators to the school for Friday night classes, a tradition that would continue for many years. Several years later Disney hired a Chouinard teacher named Donald Graham to teach more formal classes on studio property.  Chouinard would later be used by Disney as a breeding ground for artists for Snow White and the Seven Dwarfs. In the early 1950s Mrs. Chouinard had a stroke and could not run the school; in gratitude for letting his animators study there, Walt Disney supported the school financially and took over administrative duties. He also attempted to expand the school into what he called a "City of the Arts". This eventually led to the merger of Chouinard and Los Angeles Conservatory of Music into the California Institute of the Arts in 1961. Chouinard officially closed when its successor began operations in 1970.

Legacy
The Chouinard Art Institute building is situated at 743 Grand View Street in the Westlake district of central Los Angeles. Today it is used by the Western Day Care School, a child-care center.

Dave Tourjé, who became fascinated by the institute's history after buying and restoring Nelbert Chouinard’s 1907 home in South Pasadena, California, helped to establish the Chouinard Foundation, which produced a 2001 retrospective exhibition and gave art classes, first in its own building and then under contract with the City of Los Angeles Department of Recreation and Parks. Since 2009, when funding for the art classes ran out, Tourje has focused on keeping the Chouinard name alive, including a Chouinard Foundation website with archival material.

Produced and directed by Gianina Ferreyra in 2013, the 51-minute documentary film Curly addresses the school’s history from 1921 to 1972, including interviews with artists Larry Bell, Laddie John Dill, Llyn Foulkes, Joe Goode, Ed Ruscha, and Peter Shire, among others.

Notable alumni

 Manuel Gregorio Acosta (1921–1989), painter and illustrator
 Terry Allen, singer and painter
 Gladys Aller (1915–1970), painter
 John Altoon (1925–1969), painter
 Pete Alvarado (1920–2003), animator and comic book artist
 Robert Alvarez, animator
 Charles Arnoldi, painter, sculptor, and printmaker
 Ralph Bacerra (1938–2008), ceramist
 Don Bachardy, portrait artist
 Milo Baughman (1923–2003), modern furniture designer
 Larry Bell, artist and sculptor
 Ted Berman (1919–2001), animator
 Ed Benedict (1912–2006), animator, designer
 Marjorie Best (1903–1997), costume designer
 Mary Blair (1911–1978), painter, animator
 Preston Blair (1908–1995), animator
 Robert Blue (1946–1998), pin-up artist
 Harry Bowden (1907–1965), painter
 Michael Bowen (1937–2009), painting, performance art
 Cory Buckner, architect
 Timothy J. Clark, painter
 Mary Corse, painter associated with the Light and Space movement
 Richard Cromwell (1910–1960), actor 
 Alice Estes Davis, costume designer
 Ernest de Soto (1923–2014), master lithographer
 John DeCuir (1918–1991), art director
 Guy Dill, sculptor
 Donfeld (1934–2007), costume designer
 Boyd Elder (1944–2018) Experimental & album cover artist
 Jules Engel (1909–2003), animator and painter
 Lilly Fenichel (1927–2016), painter
 Sandra Fisher (1947–1994), painter
 Llyn Foulkes, painter
 Gyo Fujikawa (1908–1998), children's book author and illustrator
 Hisao "Hy" Fujita (1937-), graphic designer, illustrator, photographer
 S. Neil Fujita (1921–2010), graphic designer.
 A.C. Gamer (1899-1964), effects animator
 Harper Goff (1911–1993), artist and art director
 Jack Goldstein (1945–2003), painter
 Joe Goode, painter
 Rick Griffin (1944–1991), artist and cartoonist
 Roberta Griffith, painter and ceramist
 Frederick Hammersley (1919–2009), painter
 Laverne Harding (1905–1984), animator
 Edith Head (1897–1981), costume designer
 Larry Huber, animator
 Robert Irwin, installation artist
 Elois Jenssen (1922–2004), costume designer
 Ollie Johnston (1912–2008), animator, one of Disney's Nine Old Men
 Chuck Jones (1912–2002), animator of Looney Tunes and Merrie Melodies
 Corita Kent (1918–1986), artist
 Bob Kurtz, animator
 Abe Levitow (1922–1975), animator
 John J. Lloyd (1922–2014), art director and production designer
 Bud Luckey (1934–2018), animator
 Bob Mackie, fashion and costume designer
 Mara McAfee (1929–1984), painter and illustrator 
 John McGrew (1910-1999), animator
 Bill Melendez (1916–2008), animator
 Peter Menefee, costume- and stage-designer
 Reid Miles (1927–1993), graphic designer and photographer
 Ron Miyashiro, painter, jewelry maker, and assemblage artist
 Jimmy T. Murakami (1933–2014), animator
 Patrick Nagel (1945–1984), artist
 Maurice Noble (1911–2001), background artist
 Milicent Patrick (1915–1998), artist, actress, and animator
 Virgil Partch (1916–1984), cartoonist
 Walter Peregoy (1925–2015), artist
 Danny Pierce (1920–2014), painter, printmaker and sculptor
 Sally Pierone (1921–2018), artist
 Noah Purifoy (1917–2004), sculptor
 Milton Quon (1913–2019), animator
 Elsa Rady (1943–2011), ceramist
 Wolfgang Reitherman (1909–1985), animator, one of Disney's Nine Old Men
 Allen Ruppersberg, artist
 Edward Ruscha, painter
 Herbert Ryman (1910–1989), artist and Disney imagineer
 Retta Scott (1916–1990), Disney's first female animator
 Rod Scribner (1910–1976), animator
 Millard Sheets (1907–1989), painter
 Peter Shire, sculptor, furniture designer, and ceramist
 Ken Shutt (1928–2010), American sculptor
 William E. Smith (artist)  (1913-1997), printmaker, instructor, sign designer
 Dan Spiegle (1920–2017), comic book artist 
 Buck Taylor (1938-), painter and actor
 Michele Martin Taylor, painter
 Frank Thomas (1912–2004), animator, one of Disney's Nine Old Men
 Morton Traylor (1918–1996), fine artist, designer, and serigrapher 
 John Van Hamersveld, graphic artist and illustrator
 Roy Williams (1907–1976), Disney animator and gagman
 Dan Wynn (1920–1995), photographer
 Jack Zander (1908–2007), animator

Nelbert Chouinard Award winners 
This award is given by a Chouinard peer committee to alumni or individuals associated with Chouinard Art Institute who have embodied the spirit of Nelbert Chouinard as artists and by contributions to their community. Awardees must have elevated the profile of their particular art form, broken through ceilings or set industry trends to be considered. In addition, the committee reviews each nominees past leadership roles, exhibition(s), award(s), publication(s) and if they have given back to their community philanthropically, as a teacher or as a volunteer.

 Alice Estes Davis '50, costume designer
 Don Bachardy '60, 2016, portrait artist
 Leo Monahan '58, 2018, paper sculptor
 Larry Bell '59, 2019, artist and sculptor

References

External links
 CalArts Chouinard page
 Chouinard Foundation
 Chouinard: A living legacy exhibit

Art schools in California
California Institute of the Arts
Universities and colleges in Los Angeles
Defunct private universities and colleges in California
Westlake, Los Angeles
Arts organizations established in 1921
Educational institutions established in 1921
Educational institutions disestablished in 1961
1921 establishments in California
1961 disestablishments in California
Art in Greater Los Angeles